The Intact Centre is an office building located in Toronto, Ontario, Canada that serves as the head offices of Ontario Power Generation and Intact Financial. It was originally built in 1975 for Ontario Hydro (of which OPG is a successor company) and has been previously known as Hydro Place, Ontario Hydro Building and Ontario Power Building.

It was designed by the architect Kenneth Raymond Cooper with Consulting Architect Kenneth H. Candy, Chief Architect of Ontario Hydro, and Adamson Associates.

The building is served by Queen's Park station on the Toronto subway.

See also
 Ontario Power Generation
 Intact Financial
 Tour Intact, Montreal

External links

Ontario Power Building at TO Built

Buildings and structures in Toronto
Ontario Hydro
Ontario Power Generation
International style architecture in Canada
Headquarters in Canada
Office buildings completed in 1975
Corporate headquarters